Frayed Knights: The Skull of S'makh-Daon is a 3D RPG for Microsoft Windows created by American studio Rampant Games.

Plot 
From the developer's website:

Reception 

Frayed Knights received a 6.0/10 at GameSpot, where it was praised for its old-school style and silly humor but criticized for many other aspects, such as its poor interface and numerous bugs. The game received a 2.5/5 score at RPGamer.

References

External links
 
 Video review at Armchair Arcade
 Video interview with Jay Barnson

2011 video games
Fantasy video games
Indie video games
Role-playing video games
Video games developed in the United States
Windows games
Windows-only games